Origins is the debut studio album from American rock band Bridge to Grace.  The album was released on 28 August 2015 via Long Run Records and was produced by Rick Beato.

Background 
In the latter half of 2013, the band released their initial EP, Staring in the Dark, produced by Rick Beato.  Before creating this work, the ensemble recorded eight additional songs, whose recorded versions had been kept private.  Garcia reported that the band chose to save the eight tunes and "ride [the] five songs out".  To begin 2014, "The Fold", which was the debut single from the band, was released to radio.

In March 2015, the group released "Bitch", the second single overall from the ensemble.  Five months later, the band published a music video for "Everything", a single from Origins, which was, at the time, to be the title of their first studio album.  The album was then published three days later.

Touring 
In September 2015, the ensemble toured with Full Devil Jacket and performed throughout the United States that next month with American hard rock band Pop Evil.  In early 2016, the group traveled the United States along with The Veer Union, Artifas and Bobaflex.

Critical reception 
Todd Jolicoeur of 100% Rock Magazine depicted the studio album as "ambitious, clocking in at over an hour" and "featuring seventeen tracks full of rock".  Chris Gonda of PureGrainAudio, however, described the work as "loaded with tons of hooks, melody, heavy guitar, powerful musicianship, and outstanding singing".

Track listing

Personnel 
 David Garcia - lead vocals
 Alex Cabrera - lead guitar, piano, vocals  
 Justin Little - drums, backing vocals
 Christian Lowenstein - bass guitar
 Rick Beato - composer, producer
 Michael Loy - composer

Singles

References

External links 

Bridge to Grace albums
2015 albums